Sherley Moore (May 1, 1895 – December 21, 1971) was an American Negro league pitcher in the 1910s.

A native of Eminence, Kentucky, Moore made his Negro leagues debut in 1914 with the Louisville White Sox, and played for Louisville again the following season. He died in Louisville, Kentucky in 1971 at age 76.

References

External links
 and Seamheads

1895 births
1971 deaths
Louisville White Sox players
Baseball pitchers
Baseball players from Kentucky
People from Henry County, Kentucky
20th-century African-American sportspeople